Aghade Holed Stone or Cloghaphoill is a large holed stone and Irish National Monument located in Aghade, County Carlow, Ireland.

Description

History and legend

Archaeologists believe that the stone was originally a door to a megalithic tomb. The hole may have permitted the offering of food or other objects to the dead.

The 14th-century Book of Ballymote offers a story where Niall of the Nine Hostages ties Eochaid, son of Énnae Cennsalach mac Labhradh (a 5th-century King of Leinster) to the Aghade Holed Stone and sends nine men to kill him:

Up to the 18th century it was common for sick children to be passed through the hole, in the belief that this would cure them.

References

National Monuments in County Carlow